Hoops & Yoyo (stylized as hoops&yoyo) is an animated franchise by Hallmark Cards that centers around the titular pair of characters. While the franchise is primarily a line of greeting cards, the characters also had a website that featured: e-cards, animated episodes, an "Ask hoops & yoyo" section, desktop and phone wallpapers, audio snippets, IM icons, fan photos, interactive monthly calendars, a blog, a podcast, games, and merchandise available for purchase. The plotlines for Hoops & Yoyo-related content center around the titular characters having fun and enjoying life, occasionally alongside their other friends. The last piece of content produced for the franchise to date was the fourth episode of its podcast in 2015.

Characters

Hoops (voiced by Mike Adair) – Hoops is a sassy pink cat who is best friends with Yoyo. He often gets excited and starts yelling or talking fast. He likes coffee, donuts, and his two best friends, Yoyo and Piddles.
Yoyo (voiced by Bob Holt) – Yoyo is a green rabbit. He is excitable and prone to mistakes. Yoyo shares the same hyperactive qualities and food-preferences as his best friend, Hoops.
Piddles (voiced by Bev Carlson) – Piddles is a small, blue mouse-like character who is usually called a "critter." As a close friend to Hoops and Yoyo, she has a high pitched voice and is highly intelligent.
Chili Bear (voiced by Peter Martin) – Chili Bear is Hoops and Yoyo's boss at work. He only talks very rarely, and was mostly seen on the Hoops and Yoyo website.
Marshy (voiced by Mike Adair) – Marshy is a marshmallow monster that antagonizes Hoops and Yoyo, and also appears in their nightmares. He sometimes does things wrong, and always talks about him being so large.
Puck – Puck is a purple mouse that occasionally appeared on the Hoops and Yoyo website's homepages.
Bluebird – Bluebird is a bluebird that appeared on the Hoops and Yoyo website.

Television
The characters were used on the Hallmark Channel in November and December 2009-2010 as part of a programming block titled "Hallmark Channel's Movie Night with Hoops & Yoyo." This is the first time that Hallmark Cards and Hallmark Channel collaborated on a project together. On November 25, 2011, CBS premiered a Hoops & Yoyo Christmas TV special produced by Hallmark, titled Hoops & Yoyo Ruin Christmas. On October 26, 2012, Hallmark Channel aired a sequel, Hoops & Yoyo's Haunted Halloween.

Albums
In December 2005, Hallmark released a Hoops & Yoyo holiday CD entitled Jingle Jingle Wiggle. It features both vocal and instrumental music. All of the music is played by Yoyo. The CD also features the animated short "A Bongo Christmas." They have also released a CD entitled One Donut a Day! on July 1, 2007. It includes 19 short songs.

Controversy 
In 2010, Hallmark pulled an astronomy-themed Hoops & Yoyo "talking" graduation card off shelves after members of the Los Angeles, California chapter of the NAACP claimed that it contained a racist message. The greeting card contained the words: "And you black holes -- you're so ominous! And you planets? Watch your back!" However, the Los Angeles NAACP members felt that the card was offensive because "black holes" sounded like "black whores" in the recording. Hallmark denied that the card was in any way racist, but pulled it from its stores nonetheless.

References

Animated characters
Animated duos
Fictional cats
Fictional rabbits and hares
Greeting cards
Hallmark Cards
Fictional characters introduced in 2003
American animated web series